The following highways are numbered 675:

Philippines
 N675 highway (Philippines)

United States
 
Interstate 675 (Georgia), a connection south of Atlanta, Georgia
Interstate 675 (Michigan), a loop through Saginaw, Michigan
Interstate 675 (Ohio), a partial bypass of Dayton, Ohio